Leptogenys peuqueti is a species of ant of the subfamily Ponerinae. It is found in India, Sri Lanka, China, Vietnam, and Philippines.

References

External links

 at antwiki.org

Animaldiversity.org
Itis.org

Ponerinae
Hymenoptera of Asia
Insects described in 1887